Prathikaram is a 1972 Indian Malayalam-language film, directed by Kumar. The film stars Jayabharathi, Thikkurissy Sukumaran Nair, Alummoodan and C. L. Anandan. The film's score was composed by M. B. Sreenivasan.

Cast
Jayabharathi as Shobha
Thikkurissy Sukumaran Nair as Pankajakshan Nair
Alummoodan as Peethambharan
C. L. Anandan as Raju, Soman
Aranmula Ponnamma as Raju's mother
Kanchana (old)
Kamal Haasan Uncredited role of a Punjabi singer in a song
S. P. Pillai as Shobha's father
Jose Prakash as Sreedharan Thampi
Adoor Pankajam as Kamalam
K. V. Shanthi as Vimala
Baby Sumathi as Leela

Soundtrack
The music was composed by M. B. Sreenivasan with lyrics by Sreekumaran Thampi.

References

External links
 

1972 films
1970s Malayalam-language films